Finesse is a technique in the card game of contract bridge.

Finesse may also refer to:

 "Finesse" (song), a 2016 song by Bruno Mars from the album 24K Magic
 "Finesse" (Pheelz song), a 2022 song by Pheelz
 Finesse (Toshiko Akiyoshi album), 1978 
 Finesse (Glenn Jones album), 1984
 Finesse (character), a Marvel Comics character
 Finesse Mitchell (born 1972), American comedian
 Finesse Motorsport, a British motor racing team
 Finesse pitcher
 Finesse, shampoo made by Lornamead and owned by Unilever
 Finesse, aviation term for Glide ratio
 Finesse OS, operating system for Cisco PIX firewall
 Finesse, a term in optics for an attribute characterizing the selectivity or Q factor of an optical cavity, such as a Fabry–Perot interferometer
 FINESSE, for Fast Infrared Exoplanet Spectroscopy Survey Explorer, a proposed NASA mission 
 Lord Finesse (born 1970), American rapper and hip-hop record producer